Lukttinden is a  tall mountain in the municipality of Vefsn in Nordland county, Norway. The mountain lies between the towns of Mo i Rana and Mosjøen, directly east of the lake Ømmervatnet and directly south of the lake Luktvatnet. It lies to the west of the Okstindan mountains. Lukttinden is well known for having easy hiking conditions.

Name
The mountain is named after the lake Luktvatnet. This name is probably from the Southern Sami language word Loektejaevrie, a compound of loekti which means 'inlet' and jaevrie which means 'lake', thus "the lake with many inlets".  The suffix -tinden is the finite form of tind meaning 'mountain peak'.

References

External links
 topptur.net - information and tour planning
 Rana Spesialsport - information and tour planning

Mountains of Nordland
Vefsn